The UK Albums Chart is one of many music charts compiled by the Official Charts Company that calculates the best-selling albums of the week in the United Kingdom. Since 2004 the chart has been based on the sales of both physical albums and digital downloads. This list shows albums that peaked in the Top 10 of the UK Albums Chart during 2011, as well as albums which peaked in 2010 and 2012 but were in the top 10 in 2011. The entry date is when the album appeared in the top 10 for the first time (week ending, as published by the Official Charts Company, which is six days after the chart is announced).

One-hundred and fifty-three albums were in the top ten this year. One album from 2009 and nineteen albums from 2010 remained in the top 10 for several weeks at the beginning of the year, while Stereo Typical by Rizzle Kicks was released in 2011 but did not reach its peak until 2012. Loud by Rihanna, Sigh No More by Mumford & Sons, The Beginning by The Black Eyed Peas and The Lady Killer by CeeLo Green were the albums from 2010 to reach their peak in 2011. Twelve artists scored multiple entries in the top 10 in 2011. Drake, Ed Sheeran, Jessie J, Matt Cardle, One Direction , Rebecca Ferguson and Rizzle Kicks. were among the many artists who achieved their first UK charting top 10 album in 2011.

The 2010 Christmas number-one album, Progress by Take That, remained at the top spot for the first week of 2011. The first new number-one album of the year was Loud by Rihanna. Overall, twenty-five different albums peaked at number-one in 2011, with Amy Winehouse (2) having the most albums hitting that position.

Background

Multiple entries
One-hundred and fifty-three albums charted in the top 10 in 2011, with one-hundred and thirty-five albums reaching their peak this year (including 19, All Over the World: The Very Best of Electric Light Orchestra, Back to Black, Frank and Nevermind, which charted in previous years but reached a peak on their latest chart run).

Twelve artists scored multiple entries in the top 10 in 2011. Amy Winehouse and Glee cast both had four top 10 albums in 2011. Adele, Alfie Boe, Daniel O'Donnell, JLS, Kate Bush, Michael Bublé, Olly Murs, Rihanna, Susan Boyle and The Wanted were the acts who had two top 10 albums this year. Alfie Boe, Daniel O'Donnell and Kate Bush's two entries were both released this year, with Frank by Amy Winehouse returning after missing the top 10 when it was first released in 2003 and 19 by Adele and Back to Black by Amy Winehouse both returning after making the top ten before.

Chart debuts
Thirty-eight artists achieved their first top 10 album in 2011 as a lead artist. Alfie Boe had one other entry in his breakthrough year.

The following table (collapsed on desktop site) does not include acts who had previously charted as part of a group and secured their first top 10 solo album, or featured appearances on compilations or other artists recordings.

Notes
The group Beady Eye was fronted by Liam Gallagher, one half of the Gallagher brothers from Oasis. Their entry Different Gear, Still Speeding went straight in at number 3. His brother Noel Gallagher made the chart again with his group Noel Gallagher's High Flying Birds, topping the rankings with their self-titled album. Nicole Scherzinger charted at number 8 with her debut solo album Killer Love, adding to her success as part of The Pussycat Dolls. Charlie Simpson previously featured in the line-ups of Busted and Fightstar. Young Pilgrim marked his first time in the top 10 as a solo artist.

Soundtracks
The cast of the TV series Glee had four top-ten albums in 2011. This included Glee: The Music Presents the Warblers, Glee: The Music, Volume 4, Glee: The Music, Volume 5 and Glee: The Music, Volume 6.

Best-selling albums
Adele had the best-selling album of the year with 21. The album spent 76 weeks in the top 10 (including 23 weeks at number one), sold over 3.772 million copies and was certified 14× platinum by the BPI. Christmas by Michael Bublé came in second place. Bruno Mars' Doo-Wops & Hooligans, 19 from Adele and Mylo Xyloto by Coldplay made up the top five. Albums by Rihanna (Loud), Lady Gaga, Jessie J, Ed Sheeran and Rihanna (Talk That Talk) were also in the top ten best-selling albums of the year.

Top-ten albums
Key

 

Entries by artist

The following table shows artists who achieved two or more top 10 entries in 2011, including albums that reached their peak in 2010. The figures only include main artists, with featured artists and appearances on compilation albums not counted individually for each artist. The total number of weeks an artist spent in the top ten in 2011 is also shown.

Notes

 Stereo Typical reached its peak of number five on 4 February 2012 (week ending).
 Crazy Love re-entered the top 10 at number 7 on 16 April 2011 (week ending).
 JLS re-entered the top 10 at number 8 on 6 March 2010 (week ending).
 Sigh No More re-entered the top 10 at number 6 on 2 January 2011 (week ending) for 3 weeks and at number 2 on 26 February 2011 (week ending) for 3 weeks.
 Lights re-entered the top 10 at number 9 on 8 January 2011 (week ending) for 6 weeks and at number 10 on 14 May 2011 (week ending).
 The Defamation of Strickland Banks re-entered the top 10 at number 3 on 8 January 2011 (week ending) for 5 weeks and at number 7 on 26 February 2011 (week ending) for 2 weeks.
 Eliza Doolittle re-entered the top 10 at number 9 on 22 January 2011 (week ending) for 3 weeks.
 Teenage Dream re-entered the top 10 at number 5 on 30 October 2010 (week ending) for 2 weeks, at number 9 on 20 November 2010 (week ending) for 2 weeks, at number 8 on 8 January 2011 (week ending) for 2 weeks, at number 8 on 29 October 2011 (week ending) and at number 6 on 7 April 2012 (week ending).
 Hands All Over re-entered the top 10 at number 10 on 29 October 2011 (week ending).
 Disc-Overy re-entered the top 10 at number 4 on 8 January 2011 (week ending) for 4 weeks and at number 6 on 26 February 2011 (week ending) for 2 weeks.
 The Wanted re-entered the top 10 at number 5 on 8 January 2011 (week ending).
 Seasons of My Soul re-entered the top 10 at number 6 on 15 January 2011 (week ending) for 3 weeks and at number 9 on 12 February 2011 (week ending) for 2 weeks.
 The Lady Killer re-entered the top 10 at number 4 on 15 January 2011 (week ending) for 5 weeks, at number 9 on 5 March 2011 (week ending) for 2 weeks, at number 8 on 23 April 2011 (week ending) for 3 weeks, at number 9 on 16 July 2011 (week ending) and at number 8 on 22 October 2011 (week ending).
 Progress re-entered the top 10 at number 10 on 19 February 2011 (week ending) for 2 weeks, at number 9 on 11 June 2011 (week ending) and at number 3 on 25 June 2011 (week ending) for 5 weeks.
 Loud re-entered the top 10 at number 9 on 2 July 2011 (week ending), at number 8 on 16 July 2011 (week ending) for 3 weeks, at number 10 on 13 August 2011 (week ending) and at number 10 on 3 September 2011 (week ending).
 Outta This World re-entered the top 10 at number 10 on 5 March 2011 (week ending).
 19 originally peaked at number-one upon its initial release in 2008.
 Doo-Wops & Hooligans re-entered the top 10 at number 8 on 16 April 2011 (week ending) for 10 weeks, at number 8 on 2 July 2011 (week ending) for 9 weeks, at number 10 on 17 September 2011 (week ending), at number 10 on 8 September 2011 (week ending) for 2 weeks, at number 9 on 29 October 2011 (week ending) for 2 weeks, at number 10 on 10 December 2011 (week ending) for 2 weeks and at number 2 on 7 January 2012 (week ending) for 6 weeks.
 21 re-entered the top 10 at number 9 on 14 July 2012 (week ending) and at number 7 on 27 July 2012 (week ending) for 4 weeks.
 No More Idols re-entered the top 10 at number 10 on 7 May 2011 (week ending), at number 9 on 21 May 2011 (week ending) for 3 weeks, at number 9 on 30 July 2011 (week ending) for 3 weeks and at number 9 on 27 August 2011 (week ending). 
 Simply Eva re-entered the top 10 at number 10 on 9 April 2011 (week ending).
 Who You Are re-entered the top 10 at number 6 on 9 July 2011 (week ending) for 2 weeks, at number 10 on 20 August 2011 (week ending), at number 10 on 7 January 2012 (week ending) for 2 weeks, at number 10 on 28 January 2012 (week ending) for 6 weeks, at number 5 on 7 April 2012 (week ending) for 6 weeks, at number 7 on 16 June 2012 (week ending) and at number 7 on 25 August 2012 (week ending).
 Build a Rocket Boys! re-entered the top 10 at number 9 on 16 April 2011 (week ending) for 2 weeks.
 What Did You Expect from the Vaccines re-entered the top 10 at number 6 on 21 January 2012 (week ending) for 3 weeks.
 The King of Limbs re-entered the top 10 at number 7 on 7 May 2011 (week ending).
 Wasting Light re-entered the top 10 at number 9 on 28 May 2011 (week ending) and at number 8 on 23 July 2011 (week ending) for 2 weeks.
 Deleted Scenes from the Cutting Room Floor re-entered the top 10 at number 8 on 25 June 2011 (week ending) for 7 weeks.
 All Over the World: The Very Best of Electric Light Orchestra originally peaked at number 6 upon its initial release in 2005.
 4 re-entered the top 10 at number 6 on 14 January 2012 (week ending) for 3 weeks.
 Back to Black originally peaked at number 3 upon its initial release in 2006, rising to number-one the following year. It re-entered the top 10 following the death of Amy Winehouse.
 Frank originally peaked outside the top ten at number 60 upon its initial release in 2003, rising to its previous peak of number 13 the following year. It re-entered the top 10 following the death of Amy Winehouse.
 Frank/Back to Black was a double album featuring Amy Winehouse's two studio albums, Frank and Back to Black.
 Watch the Throne re-entered the top 10 at number 7 on 7 July 2012 (week ending) for 2 weeks.
 Nothing but the Beat re-entered the top 10 at number 9 on 11 February 2012 (week ending) for 2 weeks and at number 9 on 24 March 2012 (week ending) for 7 weeks.
 + re-entered the top 10 at number 8 on 26 May 2012 (week ending) and at number 2 on 16 June 2012 (week ending) for 13 weeks. 
 Velociraptor! re-entered the top 10 at number 9 on 21 January 2012 (week ending).
 Duets II re-entered the top 10 at number 9 on 15 October 2011 (week ending).
 Noel Gallagher's High Flying Birds re-entered the top 10 at number 8 on 21 January 2012 (week ending) and at number 9 on 4 February 2012 (week ending) for 2 weeks.
 Mylo Xyloto re-entered the top 10 at number 6 on 3 March 2012 (week ending) for 3 weeks, at number 7 on 31 March 2012 (week ending) for 2 weeks, at number 5 on 16 June 2012 (week ending), at number 7 on 14 July 2012 (week ending) for 2 weeks and at number 4 on 22 September 2012 (week ending) for 2 weeks.
 Ceremonials re-entered the top 10 at number 8 on 28 January 2012 (week ending) for 2 weeks and at number 9 on 3 March 2012 (week ending) for 2 weeks.
 Stereo Typical re-entered the top 10 at number 9 on 28 January 2012 (week ending) for 3 weeks.
 Talk That Talk re-entered the top 10 at number 9 on 9 June 2012 (week ending) for  weeks, at number 9 on 7 July 2012 (week ending) for 2 weeks, at number 6 on 28 July 2012 (week ending) for 7 weeks.
 Up All Night re-entered the top 10 at number 10 on 25 August 2012 (week ending).
 Greatest Hits (Westlife album) re-entered the top 10 at number 9 on 24 November 2011 (week ending) for 2 weeks.
 In Case You Didn't Know re-entered the top 10 at number 7 on 5 May 2012 (week ending) for 2 weeks.
 Heaven'' re-entered the top 10 at number 10 on 25 February 2012 (week ending), at number 6 on 19 May 2012 (week ending) for 2 weeks and at number 5 on 27 October 2012.
 Figure includes album that peaked in 2009.
 Figure includes album that peaked in 2010.
 Figure includes album that first charted in 2010 but peaked in 2011.

See also
2011 in British music
List of number-one albums from the 2000s (UK)

References
General

Specific

External links
2011 album chart archive at the Official Charts Company (click on relevant week)

United Kingdom top 10 albums
Top 10 albums
2011